Soualiho Meïté (born 17 March 1994) is a French professional footballer who plays as a midfielder for   club Cremonese on loan from Benfica.

Club career

Early career
On 14 March 2011, Meïté signed his first professional contract agreeing to a three-year deal with Auxerre. He was subsequently promoted to the senior team by manager Laurent Fournier and assigned the number 32 shirt. Meïté made his professional debut on 20 November in a 2–1 defeat against Valenciennes, appearing as a substitute.

Monaco
On 17 June 2017, Meïté was transferred to Monaco for €8 million. He made his debut for the club on 16 September that year.

On 2 January 2018, Meïté was loaned to Bordeaux. He scored his first goal on 15 April in a 3–1 away win against Montpellier.

Torino
On 10 July, Meïté was signed by Italian club Torino through an equal exchange with full-back Antonio Barreca, who moved to Monaco. He made his debut for the Granata on 12 August during Coppa Italia against Cosenza (4-0) as a starter. He scored his first goal for the club on 26 August in a 2–2 draw against Inter Milan at San Siro.

On 14 January, Meïté signed with AC Milan, on loan from Torino with an option to buy.

Benfica

Cremonese
On 1 September 2022, Meïté joined Cremonese on loan with an option to buy.

International career
Born in France, Meïté is of Ivorian descent. A former France youth international, he represented his nation at under-16 and under-17 level. He played with the under-17 team at the 2011 FIFA U-17 World Cup.

Career statistics

Club

Honours
Zulte Waregem
Belgian Cup: 2016–17

References

External links
 
 
 
 
 
 
 

Living people
1994 births
French footballers
France youth international footballers
French expatriate footballers
French sportspeople of Ivorian descent
Association football midfielders
Footballers from Paris
AJ Auxerre players
Lille OSC players
S.V. Zulte Waregem players
AS Monaco FC players
FC Girondins de Bordeaux players
Torino F.C. players
A.C. Milan players
S.L. Benfica footballers
U.S. Cremonese players
Ligue 1 players
Ligue 2 players
Championnat National 2 players
Championnat National 3 players
Belgian Pro League players
Serie A players
Primeira Liga players
Expatriate footballers in Belgium
French expatriate sportspeople in Belgium
Expatriate footballers in Italy
French expatriate sportspeople in Italy
Expatriate footballers in Portugal
French expatriate sportspeople in Portugal